Dream Again is an album by guitarist Phil Keaggy, released in 2006. His first new studio vocal album since the 2000 release of Lights of Madrid, Keaggy described it as a "relationship album." It contains songs dedicated to his older sisters ("Kathy's Song" and "How Can I Thank You"), his wife Bernadette ("It's You and Me"), and his daughter Olivia ("There With You"), as well as other personal references. Additionally, his son Ian adds acoustic guitar and vocals and his daughter Alicia performs vocals on "Micah 6:8".

Track listing
"Dream Again"
"Why"
"Redemption"
"Thank You for Today"
"Revive Me"
"There With You"
"Traveling Light"
"Micah 6:8"
"Kathy's Song"
"It's You and Me"
"How Can I Thank You"
"Love is the Reason"

Personnel
Phil Keaggy - vocals, producer, instrumentation
Ian Keaggy - acoustic guitar, vocals
Alicia Keaggy - vocals
Tom Howard - piano
Chris McHugh - drums
Mike Radovosky - drums
Tom Shinness - bass, cello, harmonium, tambourine, backing vocals  
Jonathon Willis - string arrangements
Richard Dodd - mastering
Loren Balman - photography, cover photo

References 

2006 albums
Phil Keaggy albums